The Lofthouse Colliery disaster was a mining accident in the West Riding of Yorkshire, England, on Wednesday 21 March 1973, in which seven mine workers died when workings flooded.

Disaster
Lofthouse Colliery was in Lofthouse Gate, close to Outwood in the Stanley Urban District, where many of the colliers lived. The site is now in the City of Wakefield. (Lofthouse is further north in the City of Leeds). A new coalface was excavated too close to an abandoned flooded 19th-century mineshaft. A six-day rescue operation succeeded in recovering only one body, that of Charles Cotton. The location of the flooded shaft was known to National Coal Board (NCB) surveyors but they had not believed it to be as deep as the modern workings. British Geological Survey records indicated that the flooded shaft did descend to the same depth but the NCB neglected to check these records.

Legacy
The incident led to the Mines (Precautions Against Inrushes) Regulations 1979 (PAIR), requiring

The response of Arthur Scargill, a compensation agent in the Yorkshire NUM, is credited with boosting his popularity with the Yorkshire miners and helping his election to the post of president of the Yorkshire Area NUM later in 1973.  He accompanied the rescue teams underground and was on site for six days with the relatives of the seven deceased.  At the enquiry he used notebooks of underground working from the 19th century retrieved from the Institute of Geological Sciences in Leeds to argue that the National Coal Board could have prevented the disaster had they acted on the information available. 

Lofthouse Colliery closed in 1981. Many of the miners took transfers to the new Selby Coalfield.

Memorial
A seven-sided stone obelisk listing the names of the seven miners was erected in Wrenthorpe above the point where the miners were trapped.

The men who died were:
Frederick Armitage, 41
Colin Barnaby, 36
Frank Billingham, 48
Sydney Brown, 36
Charles Cotton, 49 (the only miner whose body was recovered)
Edward Finnegan, 40
Alan Haigh, 30

Services and reunions were held in Wakefield and Wrenthorpe on the weekend of 23/24 March 2013 to commemorate the 40th anniversary of the disaster.

See also
Knockshinnoch Disaster
Quecreek Mine Rescue
The Price of Coal

References

External links
Rescuers recall missing Lofthouse Colliery miners

Disasters in Yorkshire
History of West Yorkshire
Lofthouse Colliery disaster
Lofthouse Colliery disaster
Lofthouse Colliery disaster
Coal mining disasters in England
1970s in West Yorkshire
Lofthouse Colliery disaster